Roy Schmidt may refer to:

Roy Schmidt (American football), American football offensive lineman
Roy Schmidt (politician), Republican member of the Michigan House of Representatives
Roy Schmidt (sprinter), German track and field athlete